The Indonesian Irian Independence Party (PKII) was a pro-Indonesian party in the Netherlands New Guinea. The party was established in 1946 by several pro-Indonesian students as a way to support the integration of Papua into the territory of Indonesia. The party's leader, Silas Papare was awarded as the National Hero of Indonesia posthumously on 14 September 1993.

The party's ideology was based on Pancasila and Christianity. The party had a youth wing, the Indonesian Youth Union (GAPI), which was formed on 28 October 1958.

Establishment 
The party was established on 29 October 1946 at the city of Serui, in the Yapen Waropen region. The party was established with Silas Papare as the leader and Alwi Rachman as his vice. The party strove for the recognition of the independence of Indonesia as a united nation from Aceh to Papua, and served as the contact for the pro-Indonesian movements all over Papua, such as in Biak, Sorong, Raja Ampat, Kaimana, Inawatan, and Fakfak. The party had around 4.000 members in Yapen Waropen.

The integration of pro-Indonesian movements in Papua under PKII alarmed the Dutch. To counter the influence of PKII in Papua, the Dutch authorities in Papua decided to form the Papuan Council, as a way to counter the influence of PKII. The council would later be turned into the Free Papua Movement after the integration of Papua into Indonesia.

To connect the pro-Indonesian movement in Papua with Indonesia, the party sent motions and resolutions to the Government of Indonesia in Jakarta regarding the independence of Indonesia and the pro-Indonesian movement in Papua. The party also sent its leader, Silas Papare, to Jakarta, as the representative of PKII.

Development 
The party established its branches on the Serui Laut city on 30 November 1947. The establishment of the branch was done by eleven members of representatives in Serui Laut, which was coordinated by Silas Papare. Andris Wayoi and Sakeus Bonai were chosen as the leaders of the branch. The branch had around 300 members as of 1947.

To garner more youth members, the party formed the Indonesian Youth Union on 28 October 1958, under the leadership of Piter Wayoi and Aser Samori. The movement had around 60 members during its formation.

References

Bibliography 

Defunct political parties in Indonesia
Politics of Netherlands New Guinea
1946 establishments in Indonesia
1962 disestablishments in Indonesia
Political parties disestablished in 1962
Political parties established in 1946